The two-empire system (two-superkingdom system) was the top-level biological classification system in general use before the establishment of the three-domain system. It classified cellular life into Prokaryota and Eukaryota as either "empires" or "superkingdoms". When the three-domain system was introduced, some biologists preferred the two-superkingdom system, claiming that the three-domain system overemphasized the division between Archaea and Bacteria. However, given the current state of knowledge and the rapid progress in biological scientific advancement, especially due to genetic analyses, that view has all but vanished.

Some prominent scientists, such as the late Thomas Cavalier-Smith, still hold and held to the two-empire system.  The late Ernst Mayr, one of the 20th century's leading evolutionary biologists, wrote dismissively of the three-domain system, "I cannot see any merit at all in a three empire cladification."  Additionally, the scientist Radhey Gupta argues for a return to the two-empire system, claiming that the primary division within prokaryotes should be among those surrounded by a single membrane (monoderm), including gram-positive bacteria and archaebacteria, and those with an inner and outer cell membrane (diderm), including gram-negative bacteria.

This system was preceded by Haeckel's three-kingdom system: Animalia, Plantae and Protista.

See also
 Domain (biology) 
 Kingdom (biology)
 Three-domain system

References

High-level systems of taxonomy